Johann Brucker may refer to:

Johann Jakob Brucker (1696–1770), German historian of philosophy
Johann Brucker, German Army Oberstleutnant, awarded the Knight's Cross on 5 April 1945